Diavolaki (Greek: Διαβολάκι; English: Little devil) is the eighth studio album by Greek singer-songwriter and record producer Nikos Karvelas, released by CBS Records Greece in May 1990. The album was certified gold in Greece.

Track listing

External links 
 Official site

1990 albums
Albums produced by Nikos Karvelas
Greek-language albums
Nikos Karvelas albums
Sony Music Greece albums